The Nutting Baronetcy, of St Helens in Booterstown in the County of Dublin, is a title in the Baronetage of the United Kingdom. It was created on 12 January 1903 for John Nutting. He was Chairman of the firm E and J Burke Ltd and a Justice of the Peace, Deputy Lieutenant and High Sheriff for County Dublin.

In 1930, Algernon Burnaby, Master of the Quorn Hunt, recruited Sir Harold Nutting, second Baronet, "newly rich from bottling Guinness", as joint Master, and quipped "We don't want your personality, we want your purse!" Jane Ridley has estimated that during the following ten years Nutting spent about £15,000 a year on the Quorn.

The third Baronet was a Conservative politician and served under Winston Churchill and Anthony Eden as Joint Parliamentary Under-Secretary of State for Foreign Affairs and as Minister of State for Foreign Affairs.  the title is held by his son, the fourth Baronet, who succeeded in 1999.

Nutting baronets, of St Helens (1903)
Sir John Gardiner Nutting, 1st Baronet (1852–1918)
Sir Harold Stansmore Nutting, 2nd Baronet (1882–1972)
Sir (Harold) Anthony Nutting, 3rd Baronet (1920–1999)
Sir John Grenfell Nutting, 4th Baronet, QC (born 1942)

The heir apparent is the present holder's only son James Edward Sebastian Nutting (born 1977).

Arms

References
Kidd, Charles, Williamson, David (editors). Debrett's Peerage and Baronetage (1990 edition). New York: St Martin's Press, 1990.

Nutting